George Allen Neeves was a member of the Wisconsin State Assembly.

Biography
Neeves was born in Cambridge, Illinois on January 3, 1842. Later, he resided in what was once Grand Rapids, Wisconsin and attended Lawrence University. Reports have differed on the exact date of his death.

Career
Neeves was a member of the Assembly during the 1872 session. Elected as an Independent, he became a Republican.

References

External links

People from Cambridge, Illinois
People from Wisconsin Rapids, Wisconsin
Wisconsin Independents
Lawrence University alumni
1842 births
Burials in Wisconsin
Year of death missing
Republican Party members of the Wisconsin State Assembly